John L. Marsden (28 January 1953) is an English former professional rugby league footballer who played in the 1970s and 1980s.

Playing career
Marsden made his début for Featherstone Rovers on Monday 25 March 1974.

Challenge Cup Final appearances
Marsden played , i.e. number 2, in Featherstone Rovers' 14-12 victory over Hull F.C. in the 1983 Challenge Cup Final during the 1982–83 season at Wembley Stadium, London on Saturday 7 May 1983, in front of a crowd of 84,969.

County Cup Final appearances
Marsden played  in Featherstone Rovers' 7-17 defeat by Castleford in the 1977 Yorkshire County Cup Final during the 1977–78 season at Headingley Rugby Stadium, Leeds on Saturday 15 October 1977.

Testimonial match
Marsden's benefit season at Featherstone Rovers took place during the 1983–84 season.

References

External links
The Story of Wembley 1983. Part I - a featherstone rovers blog
The Story of Wembley 1983. Part II - a featherstone rovers blog
The Story of Wembley 1983. Part III - a featherstone rovers blog
The Story of Wembley 1983. Part IV - a featherstone rovers blog
The Story of Wembley 1983. Part V - a featherstone rovers blog
The Story of Wembley 1983. Part VI - a featherstone rovers blog
The Story of Wembley 1983. Part VII - a featherstone rovers blog
The Story of Wembley 1983. Part VIII - a featherstone rovers blog
The Story of Wembley 1983. Part IX - a featherstone rovers blog
The Story of Wembley 1983. Part X - a featherstone rovers blog

1953 births
Living people
English rugby league players
Featherstone Rovers players
Rugby league centres
Rugby league fullbacks
Rugby league players from Pontefract